Diego Álvarez (born March 6, 1980) is a tennis player from Argentina. He won two doubles ATP Challenger events in Geneva, Switzerland and Bucaramanga, Colombia both in 2009.

ATP Challenger and ITF Futures finals

Singles: 11 (2–9)

Doubles: 43 (23–20)

References

Sources

Living people
1980 births
Argentine male tennis players
Sportspeople from Bahía Blanca